Corruption in Uganda is characterized by grand-scale theft of public funds and petty corruption involving public officials at all levels of society as well as widespread political patronage systems. Elite corruption in Uganda is through a patronage system which has been exacerbated by foreign aid. Aid has been providing the government with large amounts of resources that contribute to the corrupt practices going on within the country. The style of corruption that is used is to gain loyalty and support so that officials can remain in power. One of the more recent forms of corruption is through public procurement because of the lack of transparency with transactions that happen within the government.

Background of Corruption in Uganda 
The process of giving gifts for something in exchange has always been a feature in Ugandan tradition. In the past, this practice was the norm and not seen as illegal. This practice of patronage which has been central to politics in Uganda cannot simply be stripped away overnight.

Post-Independence Corruption 
Corruption in Uganda is not a new thing. There is a long history of corruption in Ugandan governments. Some of the governments' level of corruption were more extreme than others.

Idi Amin Regime 
Uganda under Idi Amin was a very repressive state. His military was very aggressive and would kill people if they felt like they opposed the regime in some way, which led to about 100,000 people being killed during his seven years in power. During Amin's rule he took over most businesses that were run by a different race and were given to his cronies. Many businesses began to shut down because of the lack of experience and knowledge the cronies had at running those businesses. All areas of society were being mismanaged and indisciplined. Soon, Uganda under the Amin regime became known for its culture of survival, which made corruption a central aspect to society. Many people left the formal economy and switched to informal institutions where there was no government regulation.

National Resistance Movement (NRM) 
When the National Resistance Movement gained power in Uganda, its leader Yoweri Museveni was faced with the task of reforming the government. He also had to persuade people to rejoin in the formal economy because the black market and other forms of informal institutions were widespread during the Amin regime. Museveni said that he felt like he adopted the evils of corruption. He had implemented laws and a ten-point program to help put an end to corruption in Uganda. Even though Museveni tried to reform the government, it had little impact on actually stopping corruption.

Foreign Aid 
Foreign aid has contributed to corruption in Uganda through the large amounts of money and resources that are sent over. Foreign donors attempted to liberalize the Ugandan economy to try and put a stop to corruption. The World Bank and International Monetary Fund provide assistance to Uganda through Structural Adjustment Programs. These programs encouraged Uganda to decentralize and privatize. When Uganda began privatization, they were able to do so in a non-transparent way which allowed government officials to obtain these state-owned assets.

Public sector 
There are several high corruption risk areas, such as police, judiciary and procurement. Businesses are particularly vulnerable when bidding public contracts in Uganda because processes are often non-transparent, and under-the-table cash payments are demanded from procurement officers.

On Transparency International's 2022 Corruption Perceptions Index, Uganda scored 26 on a scale from 0 ("highly corrupt") to 100 ("very clean"). When ranked by score, Uganda ranked 142nd among the 180 countries in the Index, where the country ranked last is perceived to have the most corrupt public sector.  For comparison, the best score was 90 (ranked 1), the worst score was 12 (ranked 180), and the average score was 43.

Anti-corruption efforts 
Officials continue to engage in corrupt practices despite laws and institutional instruments that are in place to prevent and punish corruption.  In an attempt to combat against corruption, Yoweri Museveni created new institutions at both the local and national level.  Donors were attracted to Uganda because of their willingness to reform and stop corruption.  Foreign donors began sending conditional aid to help Uganda with its reform process. The aid that Uganda received came in the form of structural adjustment programs, that were formed by the IMF and World Bank. Structural adjustment programs were in the form of conditional loans with reform policies that were meant to help Uganda transition to a more liberalized state.

See also
 Crime in Uganda
 International Anti-Corruption Academy
 Group of States Against Corruption
 International Anti-Corruption Day
 ISO 37001 Anti-bribery management systems
 United Nations Convention against Corruption
 OECD Anti-Bribery Convention
 Transparency International

References

External links
Uganda Corruption Profile from the Business Anti-Corruption Portal

 
Uganda
Politics of Uganda
Crime in Uganda by type
Uganda